Heathcote High School, established in 1960, is set in grounds near the Royal National Park on the southern side of Sydney, Australia. It is a Government comprehensive co-educational high school.

Parliamentary mentions

Geoff Dodds
In a debate in the Parliament of Australia, on 9 October 2006, Danna Vale MP praised several high school principals including Geoff Dodds of Heathcote High saying "I was privileged to be invited to a year 12 graduation assembly and, once again, was stirred by the thoughtful words of the principal’s Geoff Dodds final address to the students."

Bravery award
A certificate of commendation for bravery was awarded by the New South Wales Parliament to teacher Greg Moon, with the commendation stating as follows:
"Mr Moon was leading an expedition of 10 students along the Dufars river when assistant instructor Gemima Robey slipped and fell into the water at a dangerous bend. With no thought for his own safety, Mr Moon rescued Ms Robey from the river and immediately attempted to resuscitate her. Throughout this, Greg continued to manage the students who were under his care and becoming increasingly distressed."

Sporting success
In 2007, Year 12 Student Jacob Tito won the Pierre De Coubertin Award in recognition for his bravery in the sporting department. He was a contributor to sports such as swimming, athletics, touch football, Australian rules football and cross-country running (in which he was school champion, in age group, from 2005 to 2007 - Yr. 10 to Yr.12. The Pierre de Coubertin Award is nominated to those high school students across Australia, via the Australian Olympic Committee.

In 2019, Heathcote High School won the University Shield knock out rugby competition. Craig Holmes coached the team to victory, winning the grand final 56-12 against Bass High School.

Notable alumni
 Jason Bargwannaracing driver, Supercars 1998–2011. Won the 2000 Bathurst 1000 driving with Garth Tander
 Ray Barrettathlete; Indigenous Australian Paralympian
 Ella NelsonOlympian, Professional Track athlete. 4 time National 200m champion. Competed at 2016 Olympics, 2015 and 2017 World Championships, 2014 Commonwealth Games
 Marcela Bilek'Physical Scientist of the Year' 2002 and Professor of Applied Physics, University of Sydney
 Peter Hadfieldathletes; nine-times Australian champion in athletics, represented Australia at two Olympic Games and two Commonwealth Games and won Silver in 1978 Commonwealth Games Decathlon, then became an athletics commentator for ABC Radio
 Isobel Redmondpolitician; Leader of Opposition (Liberal Party) between 2009 and 2014, South Australian Parliament
 Aaron Calver professional footballer. Plays as a defender for Gwangju FC in South Korea.
 Samantha Bremner (ńee Hammond), Women's rugby league star. Fullback for the Australian Jillaroos, NSW and St.george Illawarra Dragons in the women's competition. Has also represented Australia in touch football.
 April Brandley (ńee Letton). Australian netball player. Defence player for Australian Diamonds and Collingwood in Suncorp Super Netball.
 Ben Dwarshuis. Australian Cricketer. Bowler for the Sydney Sixers. Capped by Australia in T20 format.
 Brandon Loupos. Australian Freestyle BMX Rider. X Games Gold Medal for BMX Dirt in 2018.

See also

 List of government schools in New South Wales
 Education in Australia

References

External links
 Official site

Sutherland Shire
Public high schools in Sydney
Educational institutions established in 1960
1960 establishments in Australia
Heathcote, New South Wales